Harri Järvi (20 August 1939 – 21 February 2019) was a Finnish footballer. He played in five matches for the Finland national football team in 1964.

References

1939 births
2019 deaths
Finnish footballers
Finland international footballers
Association footballers not categorized by position
Sportspeople from Vyborg